A GABA receptor agonist is a drug that is an agonist for one or more of the GABA receptors, producing typically sedative effects, and may also cause other effects such as anxiolytic, anticonvulsant, and muscle relaxant effects. There are three receptors of the gamma-aminobutyric acid. The two receptors GABA-α and GABA-ρ are ion channels that are permeable to chloride ions which reduces neuronal excitability. The GABA-β receptor belongs to the class of G-Protein coupled receptors that inhibit adenylyl cyclase, therefore leading to decreased cyclic adenosine monophosphate (cAMP). GABA-α and GABA-ρ receptors produce sedative and hypnotic effects and have anti-convulsion properties. GABA-β receptors also produce sedative effects. Furthermore, they lead to changes in gene transcription.

Types 
Many commonly used sedative and anxiolytic drugs that affect the GABA receptor complex are not agonists. These drugs act instead as positive allosteric modulators (PAMs) and while they do bind to the GABA receptors, they bind to an allosteric site on the receptor and cannot induce a response from the neuron without an actual agonist being present. Drugs that fall into this class exert their pharmacodynamic action by increasing the effects that an agonist has when potentiation is achieved.

General anaesthetics act primarily as PAMs of GABA-A receptor.
Positive allosteric modulators work by increasing the frequency with which the chloride channel opens when an agonist binds to its own site on the GABA receptor. The resulting increase in the concentration of Cl− ions in the postsynaptic neuron immediately hyperpolarizes this neuron, making it less excitable and thus inhibiting the possibility of an action potential. However, some general anaesthetics like propofol and high doses of barbiturates may not only be positive allosteric modulators of GABA-A receptors but also direct agonists of these receptors.

Alcohol is an indirect GABA agonist. GABA is the major inhibitory neurotransmitter in the brain, and GABA-like drugs are used to suppress spasms. Alcohol is believed to mimic GABA's effect in the brain, binding to GABA receptors and inhibiting neuronal signaling.

GABAA 
GABAA receptor ligands include:

Agonists 
 Abecarnil
 Barbiturates (in high doses)
 Etomidate
 Eszopiclone
 Bamaluzole
 Fengabine
 GABA
 Gabamide
 GABOB
 Gaboxadol
 Ibotenic acid
 Isoguvacine
 Isonipecotic acid
 Muscimol
 Phenibut
 Picamilon
 Progabide
 Propofol
 Quisqualamine
 SL 75102
 Thiomuscimol
 Topiramate
 Zolpidem

PAMs 

 Alcohols (e.g., ethanol, isopropanol)
 Avermectins (e.g., ivermectin)
 Barbiturates (e.g., phenobarbital)
 Benzodiazepines (e.g., diazepam, alprazolam)
 Bromides (e.g., potassium bromide)
 Carbamates (e.g., meprobamate, carisoprodol)
 Chloral hydrate, chloralose, petrichloral, and other 2,2,2-trichloroethanol prodrugs
 Chlormezanone
 Clomethiazole
 Dihydroergolines (e.g., ergoloid (dihydroergotoxine))
 Etazepine
 Etifoxine
 2-Substituted phenols (e.g., thymol, eugenol)
Imidazoles (e.g., etomidate)
 Kavalactones (found in kava)
 Loreclezole
 Neuroactive steroids (e.g., allopregnanolone, ganaxolone)
 Nonbenzodiazepines (e.g., zaleplon, zolpidem, zopiclone, eszopiclone)
 Propofol
 Piperidinediones (e.g., glutethimide, methyprylon)
 Propanidid
 Pyrazolopyridines (e.g., etazolate)
 Quinazolinones (e.g., methaqualone)
 Skullcap constituents (e.g., Baicalein)
 Stiripentol
 Disulfonylalkanes (e.g., sulfonmethane, tetronal, trional)
 Valerian constituents (e.g., valeric acid, valerenic acid)
 Volatile organic compounds (e.g., chloroform, diethyl ether, sevoflurane)

GABAB 
GABAB receptor ligands include:

Agonists
 1,4-Butanediol
 Baclofen
 GABA
 Gabamide
 GABOB
 gamma-Butyrolactone (GBL)
 gamma-Hydroxybutyric acid (GHB)
 gamma-Hydroxyvaleric acid (GHV)
 gamma-Valerolactone (GVL)
 Lesogaberan
 Phenibut
 4-Fluorophenibut 
 Picamilon
 Progabide
 SL-75102
 Tolgabide

PAMs 
 ADX-71441

GABAA-ρ 
GABAA-ρ receptor ligands include:

Agonists 
 CACA
 CAMP
 GABA
 GABOB
 N4-Chloroacetylcytosine arabinoside
 Picamilon
 Progabide
 Tolgabide

PAMs 
 Neuroactive steroids (e.g., allopregnanolone, THDOC, alphaxolone)

References

External links 
 
 

Drugs acting on the nervous system